A psychoactive drug, psychopharmaceutical, psychoactive agent or psychotropic drug is a chemical substance that changes functions of the nervous system, and results in alterations in perception, mood, consciousness, cognition, or behavior. 

These substances may be used medically, recreationally, for spiritual reasons - for example, to alter one's consciousness (as with entheogens for ritual, spiritual or shamanic purposes), or for research. 

Some categories of psychoactive drugs may be prescribed by physicians and other healthcare practitioners because of their therapeutic value. 

Examples of medication categories that may contain potentially beneficial psychoactive drugs include, but are not limited to:

 Anesthetics
 Analgesics
 Anticonvulsants
 Anti-Parkinson’s medications
 Medications used to treat Neuropsychiatric Disorders  (Antidepressants, Anxiolytics, Antipsychotics and Stimulant Medications.)

Some psychoactive substances may be used in detoxification and rehabilitation programs for people who may have become dependent upon, or addicted to, other mind or mood altering substances. Drug rehabilitation attempts to reduce addiction through a combination of psychotherapy, support groups, and sometimes - psychoactive substances.  

Psychoactive substances often bring various changes in consciousness and mood that the user may find rewarding and pleasant (e.g., euphoria or a sense of relaxation) or advantageous in an objectively observable or measurable way (e.g. increased alertness). Substances which are rewarding, and thus positively reinforcing, have the potential to induce a state of addiction – compulsive drug use despite negative consequences. In addition, sustained use of some substances may produce physical or psychological dependence, or both, associated with somatic or psychological-emotional withdrawal states respectively. 

Psychoactive drug misuse, dependence, and addiction have resulted in legal measures and moral debate. Governmental controls on manufacture, supply, and prescription attempt to reduce problematic medical drug use. Ethical concerns have also been raised about over-use of these drugs clinically, and about their marketing by manufacturers. Popular campaigns to decriminalize or legalize the recreational use of certain drugs (e.g. cannabis) are also ongoing.

History 

Psychoactive drug use can be traced to prehistory. There is archaeological evidence of the use of psychoactive substances, mostly plants, dating back at least 10,000 years, and historical evidence of cultural use over the past 5,000 years. The chewing of coca leaves, for example, dates back over 8,000 years ago in Peruvian society.

Medicinal use is one important facet of psychoactive drug usage. However, some have postulated that the urge to alter one's consciousness is as primary as the drive to satiate thirst, hunger, or sexual desire. Supporters of this belief contend that the history of drug use, and even children's desire for spinning, swinging, or sliding indicate that the drive to alter one's state of mind is universal.

One of the first people to articulate this point of view, set aside from a medicinal context, was American author Fitz Hugh Ludlow (1836–1870) in his book The Hasheesh Eater (1857):

During the 20th century, many governments across the world initially responded to the use of recreational drugs by banning them, and making their use, supply, or trade a criminal offense. A notable example of this was Prohibition in the United States, where alcohol was made illegal for 13 years. However, many governments, government officials, and persons in law enforcement have concluded that illicit drug use cannot be sufficiently stopped through criminalization. Organizations such as Law Enforcement Against Prohibition (LEAP) have come to such a conclusion, believing:
In some countries, there has been a move toward harm reduction by health services, where the use of illicit drugs is neither condoned nor promoted, but services and support are provided to ensure users have adequate factual information readily available, and that the negative effects of their use be minimized. Such is the case of the Portuguese drug policy of decriminalization, which achieved its primary goal of reducing the adverse health effects of drug abuse.

Purposes 

Psychoactive substances are used by humans for a number of different purposes, and these uses vary widely between cultures. Some substances may have controlled or illegal uses, some may have shamanic purposes, and others are used medicinally. Other examples include social drinking, nootropic, or sleep aids. Caffeine is the world's most widely consumed psychoactive substance, but unlike many others, it is legal and unregulated in nearly all jurisdictions. In North America, 90% of adults consume caffeine daily.

Psychoactive drugs are divided into different groups according to their pharmacological effects. Commonly used psychoactive drugs and groups are listed below:
 Anxiolytics. Used to reduce symptoms of anxiety and panic.
Example: benzodiazepines such as Xanax and Valium, barbiturates 
 Empathogen–entactogens

Example: MDMA (ecstasy), MDA, 6-APB, AMT
 Stimulants (colloquially referred to as "uppers"). This category comprises substances that increase wakefulness and productivity, stimulate the mind, and may cause euphoria, but do not affect vision.
Examples: amphetamine, caffeine, cocaine, nicotine, modafinil 
 Depressants (colloquially referred to as "downers"), including sedatives, hypnotics, and opioids. This category includes all of the calmative, sleep-inducing, anesthetizing substances, which sometimes induce perceptual changes, such as dream images, and often evoke feelings of euphoria.
Examples: Ethanol (alcohol), opioids such as morphine, fentanyl, and codeine, cannabis, barbiturates, benzodiazepines.
 Hallucinogens, including psychedelics, dissociatives, and deliriants. This category encompasses all substances that produce distinct alterations in perception, sensation of space and time, and emotional states

Examples: psilocybin, LSD, DMT (N,N-Dimethyltryptamine)/ayahuasca, mescaline, Salvia divinorum, Nitrous oxide, and Scopolamine

Uses

Anesthesia 

General anesthetics are a class of psychoactive drug used on people to block physical pain and other sensations. Most anesthetics induce unconsciousness, allowing the person to undergo medical procedures like surgery, without the feelings of physical pain or emotional trauma. To induce unconsciousness, anesthetics affect the GABA and NMDA systems. For example, propofol is a GABA agonist, and ketamine is an NMDA receptor antagonist.

Pain management 

Psychoactive drugs are often prescribed to manage pain. The subjective experience of pain is primarily regulated by endogenous opioid peptides. Thus, pain can often be managed using psychoactives that operate on this neurotransmitter system, also known as opioid receptor agonists. This class of drugs can be highly addictive, and includes opiate narcotics, like morphine and codeine. NSAIDs, such as aspirin and ibuprofen, are also analgesics. These agents also reduce eicosanoid-mediated inflammation by inhibiting the enzyme cyclooxygenase.

Mental disorders 

Psychiatric medications are psychoactive drugs prescribed for the management of mental and emotional disorders, or to aid in overcoming challenging behavior. There are six major classes of psychiatric medications:
 Antidepressants treat disorders such as clinical depression, dysthymia, anxiety, eating disorders and borderline personality disorder.
 Stimulants, used to treat disorders such as attention deficit hyperactivity disorder and narcolepsy, and for weight reduction.
 Antipsychotics, used to treat psychotic symptoms, such as those associated with schizophrenia or severe mania, or as adjuncts to relieve clinical depression.
 Mood stabilizers, used to treat bipolar disorder and schizoaffective disorder.
 Anxiolytics, used to treat anxiety disorders.
 Depressants, used as hypnotics, sedatives, and anesthetics, depending upon dosage.

In addition, several psychoactive substances are currently employed to treat various addictions. These include acamprosate or naltrexone in the treatment of alcoholism, or methadone or buprenorphine maintenance therapy in the case of opioid addiction.

Exposure to psychoactive drugs can cause changes to the brain that counteract or augment some of their effects; these changes may be beneficial or harmful. However, there is a significant amount of evidence that the relapse rate of mental disorders negatively corresponds with the length of properly followed treatment regimens (that is, relapse rate substantially declines over time), and to a much greater degree than placebo.

Recreation

Many psychoactive substances are used for their mood and perception altering effects, including those with accepted uses in medicine and psychiatry. Examples of psychoactive substances include caffeine, alcohol, cocaine, LSD, nicotine and cannabis. Classes of drugs frequently used recreationally include:
 Stimulants, which activate the central nervous system. These are used recreationally for their euphoric effects.
 Hallucinogens (psychedelics, dissociatives and deliriants), which induce perceptual and cognitive alterations.
 Hypnotics, which depress the central nervous system.
 Opioid analgesics, which also depress the central nervous system. These are used recreationally because of their euphoric effects.
 Inhalants, in the forms of gas aerosols, or solvents, which are inhaled as a vapor because of their stupefying effects. Many inhalants also fall into the above categories (such as nitrous oxide which is also an analgesic).

In some modern and ancient cultures, drug usage is seen as a status symbol. Recreational drugs are seen as status symbols in settings such as at nightclubs and parties. For example, in ancient Egypt, gods were commonly pictured holding hallucinogenic plants.

Because there is controversy about regulation of recreational drugs, there is an ongoing debate about drug prohibition. Critics of prohibition believe that regulation of recreational drug use is a violation of personal autonomy and freedom. In the United States, critics have noted that prohibition or regulation of recreational and spiritual drug use might be unconstitutional, and causing more harm than is prevented.

Some people who take psychoactive drugs experience drug or substance induced psychosis. A 2019 systematic review and meta-analysis by Murrie et al. found that the pooled proportion of transition from substance-induced psychosis to schizophrenia was 25% (95% CI 18%–35%), compared with 36% (95% CI 30%–43%) for brief, atypical and not otherwise specified psychoses. Type of substance was the primary predictor of transition from drug-induced psychosis to schizophrenia, with highest rates associated with cannabis (6 studies, 34%, CI 25%–46%), hallucinogens (3 studies, 26%, CI 14%–43%) and amphetamines (5 studies, 22%, CI 14%–34%). Lower rates were reported for opioid (12%), alcohol (10%) and sedative (9%) induced psychoses. Transition rates were slightly lower in older cohorts but were not affected by sex, country of the study, hospital or community location, urban or rural setting, diagnostic methods, or duration of follow-up.

Ritual and spiritual

Certain psychoactives, particularly hallucinogens, have been used for religious purposes since prehistoric times. Native Americans have used peyote cacti containing mescaline for religious ceremonies for as long as 5700 years. The muscimol-containing Amanita muscaria mushroom was used for ritual purposes throughout prehistoric Europe.

The use of entheogens for religious purposes resurfaced in the West during the counterculture movements of the 1960s and 70s. Under the leadership of Timothy Leary, new spiritual and intention-based movements began to use LSD and other hallucinogens as tools to access deeper inner exploration. In the United States, the use of peyote for ritual purposes is protected only for members of the Native American Church, which is allowed to cultivate and distribute peyote. However, the genuine religious use of peyote, regardless of one's personal ancestry, is protected in Colorado, Arizona, New Mexico, Nevada, and Oregon.

Military 

Psychoactive drugs have been used in military applications as non-lethal weapons.

Both military and civilian American intelligence officials are known to have used psychoactive drugs while interrogating captives apprehended in its "war on terror".  In July 2012 Jason Leopold and Jeffrey Kaye, psychologists and human rights workers, had a Freedom of Information Act request fulfilled that confirmed that the use of psychoactive drugs during interrogation was a long-standing 
practice. Captives and former captives had been reporting medical staff collaborating with interrogators to drug captives with powerful psychoactive drugs prior to interrogation since the very first captives release. 
In May 2003 recently released Pakistani captive Sha Mohammed Alikhel described the routine use of psychoactive drugs. He said that Jihan Wali, a captive kept in a nearby cell, was rendered catatonic through the use of these drugs.

Additionally, militaries worldwide have used or are using various psychoactive drugs to improve performance of soldiers by suppressing hunger, increasing the ability to sustain effort without food, increasing and lengthening wakefulness and concentration, suppressing fear, reducing empathy, and improving reflexes and memory-recall among other things.

The first documented case of a soldier overdosing on methamphetamine during combat, was the Finnish corporal Aimo Koivunen, a soldier who fought in the Winter War and the Continuation War.

Route of administration 
Psychoactive drugs are administered via oral ingestion as a tablet, capsule, powder, liquid, and beverage; via injection by subcutaneous, intramuscular, and intravenous route; via rectum by suppository and enema; and via inhalation by smoking, vaporizing, and snorting. The efficiency of each method of administration varies from drug to drug.

The psychiatric drugs fluoxetine, quetiapine, and lorazepam are ingested orally in tablet or capsule form. Alcohol and caffeine are ingested in beverage form; nicotine and cannabis are smoked or vaporized; peyote and psilocybin mushrooms are ingested in botanical form or dried; and crystalline drugs such as cocaine and methamphetamine are usually inhaled or snorted.

Determinants of effects
The theory of dosage, set, and setting is a useful model in dealing with the effects of psychoactive substances, especially in a controlled therapeutic setting as well as in recreational use. Dr. Timothy Leary, based on his own experiences and systematic observations on psychedelics, developed this theory along with his colleagues Ralph Metzner, and Richard Alpert (Ram Dass) in the 1960s.

 Dosage
The first factor, dosage, has been a truism since ancient times, or at least since Paracelsus who said, "Dose makes the poison." Some compounds are beneficial or pleasurable when consumed in small amounts, but harmful, deadly, or evoke discomfort in higher doses.

 Set
The set is the internal attitudes and constitution of the person, including their expectations, wishes, fears, and sensitivity to the drug. This factor is especially important for the hallucinogens, which have the ability to make conscious experiences out of the unconscious. In traditional cultures, set is shaped primarily by the worldview, health and genetic characteristics that all the members of the culture share.

 Setting
The third aspect is setting, which pertains to the surroundings, the place, and the time in which the experiences transpire.

This theory clearly states that the effects are equally the result of chemical, pharmacological, psychological, and physical influences. The model that Timothy Leary proposed applied to the psychedelics, although it also applies to other psychoactives.

Effects 

Psychoactive drugs operate by temporarily affecting a person's neurochemistry, which in turn causes changes in a person's mood, cognition, perception and behavior. There are many ways in which psychoactive drugs can affect the brain. Each drug has a specific action on one or more neurotransmitter or neuroreceptor in the brain.

Drugs that increase activity in particular neurotransmitter systems are called agonists. They act by increasing the synthesis of one or more neurotransmitters, by reducing its reuptake from the synapses, or by mimicking the action by binding directly to the postsynaptic receptor. Drugs that reduce neurotransmitter activity are called antagonists, and operate by interfering with synthesis or blocking postsynaptic receptors so that neurotransmitters cannot bind to them.

Exposure to a psychoactive substance can cause changes in the structure and functioning of neurons, as the nervous system tries to re-establish the homeostasis disrupted by the presence of the drug (see also, neuroplasticity). Exposure to antagonists for a particular neurotransmitter can increase the number of receptors for that neurotransmitter or the receptors themselves may become more responsive to neurotransmitters; this is called sensitization. Conversely, overstimulation of receptors for a particular neurotransmitter may cause a decrease in both number and sensitivity of these receptors, a process called desensitization or tolerance. Sensitization and desensitization are more likely to occur with long-term exposure, although they may occur after only a single exposure. These processes are thought to play a role in drug dependence and addiction. Physical dependence on antidepressants or anxiolytics may result in worse depression or anxiety, respectively, as withdrawal symptoms. Unfortunately, because clinical depression (also called major depressive disorder) is often referred to simply as depression, antidepressants are often requested by and prescribed for patients who are depressed, but not clinically depressed.

Affected neurotransmitter systems 
The following is a brief table of notable drugs and their primary neurotransmitter, receptor or method of action. Many drugs act on more than one transmitter or receptor in the brain.

Addiction and dependence 

Psychoactive drugs are often associated with addiction or drug dependence. Dependence can be divided into two types: psychological dependence, by which a user experiences negative psychological or emotional withdrawal symptoms (e.g., depression) and physical dependence, by which a user must use a drug to avoid physically uncomfortable or even medically harmful physical withdrawal symptoms. Drugs that are both rewarding and reinforcing are addictive; these properties of a drug are mediated through activation of the mesolimbic dopamine pathway, particularly the nucleus accumbens. Not all addictive drugs are associated with physical dependence, e.g., amphetamine, and not all drugs that produce physical dependence are addictive drugs, e.g., caffeine.

Many professionals, self-help groups, and businesses specialize in drug rehabilitation, with varying degrees of success, and many parents attempt to influence the actions and choices of their children regarding psychoactives.

Common forms of rehabilitation include psychotherapy, support groups and pharmacotherapy, which uses psychoactive substances to reduce cravings and physiological withdrawal symptoms while a user is going through detox. Methadone, itself an opioid and a psychoactive substance, is a common treatment for heroin addiction, as is another opioid, buprenorphine. Recent research on addiction has shown some promise in using psychedelics such as ibogaine to treat and even cure drug addictions, although this has yet to become a widely accepted practice.

Legality 

The legality of psychoactive drugs has been controversial through most of recent history; the Second Opium War and Prohibition are two historical examples of legal controversy surrounding psychoactive drugs. However, in recent years, the most influential document regarding the legality of psychoactive drugs is the Single Convention on Narcotic Drugs, an international treaty signed in 1961 as an Act of the United Nations. Signed by 73 nations including the United States, the USSR, Pakistan, India, and the United Kingdom, the Single Convention on Narcotic Drugs established Schedules for the legality of each drug and laid out an international agreement to fight addiction to recreational drugs by combatting the sale, trafficking, and use of scheduled drugs. All countries that signed the treaty passed laws to implement these rules within their borders. However, some countries that signed the Single Convention on Narcotic Drugs, such as the Netherlands, are more lenient with their enforcement of these laws.

In the United States, the Food and Drug Administration (FDA) has authority over all drugs, including psychoactive drugs. The FDA regulates which psychoactive drugs are over the counter and which are only available with a prescription. However, certain psychoactive drugs, like alcohol, tobacco, and drugs listed in the Single Convention on Narcotic Drugs are subject to criminal laws. The Controlled Substances Act of 1970 regulates the recreational drugs outlined in the Single Convention on Narcotic Drugs. Alcohol is regulated by state governments, but the federal National Minimum Drinking Age Act penalizes states for not following a national drinking age. Tobacco is also regulated by all fifty state governments. Most people accept such restrictions and prohibitions of certain drugs, especially the "hard" drugs, which are illegal in most countries.

In the medical context, psychoactive drugs as a treatment for illness is widespread and generally accepted. Little controversy exists concerning over the counter psychoactive medications in antiemetics and antitussives. Psychoactive drugs are commonly prescribed to patients with psychiatric disorders. However, certain critics  believe that certain prescription psychoactives, such as antidepressants and stimulants, are overprescribed and threaten patients' judgement and autonomy.

Effect on animals

A number of animals consume different psychoactive plants, animals, berries and even fermented fruit, becoming intoxicated, such as cats after consuming catnip. Traditional legends of sacred plants often contain references to animals that introduced humankind to their use. Animals and psychoactive plants appear to have co-evolved, possibly explaining why these chemicals and their receptors exist within the nervous system.

Widely used psychoactive drugs 
This is a list of commonly used drugs that contain psychoactive ingredients. Please note that the following lists contains legal and illegal drugs (based on the country's laws).

 Alcohol
 Benzodiazepines
 Caffeine
 Cannabis
 Cocaine
 Heroin
 LSD
 Methamphetamine
 Ecstasy
 Nicotine
 Opioids
 Psilocybin mushrooms

See also 

 Contact high
 Counterculture of the 1960s
 Demand reduction
 Designer drug
 Drug
 Drug addiction
 Drug checking
 Drug rehabilitation
 Hamilton's Pharmacopeia
 Hard and soft drugs
 Harm reduction
 Neuropsychopharmacology
 Psychopharmacology
 Poly drug use
 Project MKULTRA
 Psychedelic plants
 Psychoactive fish
 Recreational drug use
 Responsible drug use
 Self-medication

References

External links
 Neuroscience of Psychoactive Substance Use and Dependence by the WHO

 

fi:Psykoaktiivinen aine